The 2019 Nigerian Senate election in Akwa Ibom State was held on February 23, 2019, to elect members of the Nigerian Senate to represent Akwa Ibom State. Bassey Albert representing Akwa Ibom North-East, Christopher Stephen Ekpenyong representing Akwa Ibom North-West and Akon Etim Eyakenyi representing Akwa Ibom South all won on the platform of Peoples Democratic Party.

Overview

Summary

Results

Akwa Ibom South 
A total of 10 candidates registered with the Independent National Electoral Commission to contest in the election. PDP candidate Akon Etim Eyakenyi won the election, defeating APC Effiong Asuquo and 8 other party candidates. Etim scored 122,412 votes, while  APC candidate Effiong scored 44,053 votes.

Akwa Ibom Central North-East 
A total of 13 candidates registered with the Independent National Electoral Commission to contest in the election. PDP candidate Bassey Albert Akpan won the election, defeating APC candidate Bassey Etim and 11 other party candidates. Akpan pulled 147,731 votes, while APC candidate Etim scored 60,930.

Akwa Ibom North-West 
A total of 11 candidates registered with the Independent National Electoral Commission to contest in the election. PDP candidate Christopher Stephen Ekpenyong won the election, defeating APC candidate, Goodswill Akpabio. Ekpenyong pulled 118,215 votes while his closest rival Akpabio pulled 83,158 votes.

References 

Akwa Ibom State senatorial elections
2019 Akwa Ibom State elections
Akwa Ibom State Senate elections